Juan Sebastián Cabal won the first edition of this tournament after defeating his compatriot Robert Farah 6–4, 7–6(7–3) in the final.

Seeds

Draw

Finals

Top half

Bottom half

References
 Main Draw
 Qualifying Draw

Aguascalientes Open - Singles